Myrtleford is a town in northeast Victoria, Australia, 280 km (170 miles) northeast of Melbourne and 46 km (29 miles) southeast of Wangaratta. Myrtleford is part of the Alpine Shire local government area and in 2016 the town had a population of 3,193.

History
The post office opened on 26 July 1858 as Myrtle Creek and was renamed Myrtleford in 1871. The road through Myrtleford was then called the Buckland Road, today it is known as the Great Alpine Road.

Sports
Myrtleford Football Club compete in the Ovens & Murray Football League.

Myrtleford Savoy SC is a soccer club who compete in the Albury Wodonga Football Association. They are based at Savoy Park.

Features 
The rich soil of the region is known for its fresh local produce including vegetables, berries, nuts and olives. Myrtleford is also quite famous for its vineyards spread across the Alpine Valleys wine region which includes production of Italian Michelini Wines and Gapsted Wines. The area has abundant greenery in the form of parks such as the Jubilee Park and Rotary Park.

Climate
Myrtleford has a temperate climate with more rain in winter than in summer and a high diurnal range throughout the year. Under the Köppen climate classification, the town has an oceanic climate (Cfb).

Notable residents
 Gary Ablett Snr, Australian Rules footballer.
 Cris Bonacci, Musician, Producer
 Merv Hughes, Australian Cricketer.
 Sam Kekovich, Australian Rules footballer.
 Alby Lowerson, WWI Victoria Cross recipient.
 Steve Mautone, retired professional football association goalkeeper.
 Chloe McConville, Australian racing cyclist and former cross-country skier.
 Malcolm Milne, olympic skier.
 Ross Milne, olympic skier.
 Guy Rigoni, Australian Rules footballer.
 Jack Crisp, Australian rules footballer

References

External links

Towns in Victoria (Australia)
Alpine Shire